Northern long-eared bat is a common name for several flying mammals, species of Chiroptera 

 Myotis septentrionalis,  a North American bat, also known as the northern myotis
 Nyctophilus arnhemensis, an Australasian bat
 Nyctophilus daedalus,  another Australasian bat